François-Marie-Casimir Négrier (27 April 1788 in Le Mans – 25 June 1848 in Lille) was a French general who fought in the Napoleonic Wars and the 1848 Revolution. Aged 12 he accompanied Jean Lannes on his embassy to Portugal. From 1830 he was colonel of the 54th Infantry Regiment.

References

Sources

1788 births
1848 deaths
People from Le Mans
French generals
French military personnel of the Napoleonic Wars
Grand Officiers of the Légion d'honneur